A Cuban in Spain (Spanish:Una Cubana en España) is a 1951 musical comedy film directed by Luis Bayón Herrera. It was a co-production between Argentina, Cuba and Spain. The film's sets were designed by Francisco Prósper and Pierre Schild.

Cast
 Blanquita Amaro as Blanquita  
 Rafael Bardem as Don Agustín  
 Joaquín Bergía as Amigo  
 Francisco Bernal as Traspunte  
 Mario Cabré as Miguel Escudero  
 María Cuevas as Mujer 1ª  
 Luis Domínguez Luna as Empleado del detective  
 Marujita Díaz as Rosita  
 Manuel Guitián as Maquinista 1º  
 Casimiro Hurtado as Gitano  
 José Isbert as Jose Holmes Pérez  
 Juan Lado 
 Tito Lusiardo as Tito León  
 Concha López Silva as Adivina  
 Mónica Pastrana as Elena  
 Lola del Pino as Mujer 2ª 
 Antonio Riquelme as Maquinista 2º  
 Jacinto San Emeterio as Roberto  
 Otto Sirgo 
 Juan Vázquez as Camarero

External links
 

1951 films
1951 musical comedy films
Argentine musical comedy films
1950s Spanish-language films
Argentine black-and-white films
Cuban black-and-white films
Spanish black-and-white films
Films directed by Luis Bayón Herrera
Films scored by Juan Quintero Muñoz
Cuban musical comedy films
1950s Argentine films